Belarus participated in the 2010 Summer Youth Olympics in Singapore.

The Belarusian squad consisted of 50 athletes competing in 19 sports: aquatics (swimming), archery, athletics, basketball, boxing, canoeing, cycling, fencing, gymnastics, judo, modern pentathlon, rowing, sailing, shooting, table tennis, taekwondo, tennis, weightlifting and wrestling.

Medalists

Archery

Boys

Girls

Mixed Team

Athletics

Boys
Track and Road Events

Field Events

Girls
Track and Road Events

Field Events

Basketball

Girls

Boxing

Boys

Canoeing

Boys

Girls

Cycling

Cross Country

Time Trial

BMX

Road Race

Overall

 * Received -5 for finishing road race with all three racers

Fencing

Group Stage

Knock-Out Stage

Gymnastics

Artistic Gymnastics

Boys

Girls

Rhythmic Gymnastics 

Individual

Trampoline

Judo

Individual

Team

Modern pentathlon

Rowing

Sailing

Windsurfing

Shooting

Pistol

Rifle

Swimming

Table tennis

Individual

Team

Taekwondo

Tennis

Singles

Doubles

Weightlifting

Wrestling

Freestyle

Greco-Roman

References

External links
Competitors List: Belarus

Nations at the 2010 Summer Youth Olympics
2010 in Belarusian sport
Belarus at the Youth Olympics